HMS Porpoise was built as a storeship to a commercial design by John Henslow (Surveyor of the Navy), launched in 1798 and purchased by the Royal Navy. The Navy commissioned her in July 1798 under Lieutenant Walter Scott.

The ship was to carry a collection of trees and plants to Australia for Sir Joseph Banks and they were tended on board by George Suttor. A "garden cabin"  by  feet was built on the quarterdeck of the ship. After several abortive attempts to reach Australia the ship was condemned as unseaworthy, and the garden was transferred to the new .

The Navy renamed her Diligent in 1799 and sold her in 1802 at the end of the French Revolutionary Wars. Records in the National Maritime Museum for Diligent describe her as an "armed ship".

Citations

References
 
 

Storeships of the Royal Navy
1798 ships